Bo Tim Rade Tiger Prica (born 23 April 2002) is a Swedish professional footballer who plays as a forward for WSG Tirol in the Austrian Bundesliga. He is on loan from the Danish Superliga side AaB.

Career
On 10 August 2020 it was confirmed, that 18-year old Prica had joined Danish Superliga club AaB on a four-year deal. He got shirt number 11.

Personal life
Prica is the son of the Swedish former footballer Rade Prica. Through his father, Prica is of Serbian and Croatian descent. With his father being an expatriate footballer, Prica played youth football in multiple foreign countries before joining Malmö upon his family returning to Sweden.

Career statistics
As of 19 August 2019.

References

External links
 Tim Prica at SvFF 
 

2002 births
Living people
Footballers from Skåne County
Swedish footballers
Swedish expatriate footballers
Sweden youth international footballers
Swedish people of Serbian descent
Swedish people of Croatian descent
Malmö FF players
AaB Fodbold players
WSG Tirol players
Allsvenskan players
Danish Superliga players
Austrian Football Bundesliga players
Association football forwards
Swedish expatriate sportspeople in Denmark
Expatriate men's footballers in Denmark
Swedish expatriate sportspeople in Austria
Expatriate footballers in Austria
Sportspeople from Helsingborg